Paradise Alley is a 1958 comedy-drama, written, directed, produced by, and starring Hugo Haas. Supporting players included Carol Morris and Marie Windsor. The picture premiered in Hollywood on March 4, 1958, but was not theatrically released until May 1962.

Cast

Hugo Haas as Mr. Agus
Carol Morris as Susie Wilson (Miss Universe)
Marie Windsor as Linda Belita
Corinne Griffith as Mrs. Wilson
Billy Gilbert as Julius Wilson
Chester Conklin as Mr. Gregory
Margaret Hamilton as Mrs. Nicholson
Pat Goldin as Patrick
Don Sullivan as Steve Nicholson
William Forrest as Norman Holmes
William Schallert as Jack Williams
Tom Fadden as Mr. Nicholson
Jan Englund as Miss Stanley
Jesslyn Fax as Mrs. Holmes
Clegg Hoyt as Herb
Almira Sessions as Mrs. Walker 
Tom Duggan — Special Guest
Irwin Berke — Special Guest

References

American comedy-drama films
Films directed by Hugo Haas
1958 comedy-drama films
1958 films
Astor Pictures films
1950s English-language films
1950s American films